The Tequila Express is a Mexican regional passenger train service that operates from Guadalajara, Jalisco, to the Sauza Tequila distillery in the municipality of Tequila.<ref name="tequila_express_en"></</ref>  The municipality of Tequila is located approximately  northwest of Guadalajara and  southeast of the town of Tequila, Jalisco.  The train service is so named because it features tequila tastings and transports its passengers through blue agave fields to the distillery  "La Perseverancia"  in Tequila.

The service began operating in 1997. The service is operated by The Cámara de Comercio de Guadalajara (Guadalajara Chamber of Commerce).
The excursion includes live mariachi music, a tour of the distillery and Quinta Sauza, as well as a food buffet on the Quinta premises.

The Encuentro Internacional del Mariachi y la Charrería festival is held in Guadalajara.

See also
 Jalisco

References

External links

Named passenger trains of Mexico
Tourist attractions in Mexico
Railway lines opened in 1997
Express